Gristle may refer to:
Cartilage, when present in meat
Throbbing Gristle, an English avant-garde music and visual arts group
Gristle (G.I. Joe), a fictional villain in the G.I. Joe universe
Puppy Gristle, a 2002 album by Skinny Puppy
The House of Gristle, a 1994 British television series